D'Aquino is an Italian surname and a variant of Aquino. It may refer to:

Iva Toguri D'Aquino (1916–2006), American who participated in Radio Tokyo English-language propaganda broadcasts during World War II
John D'Aquino (born 1958), Canadian-American actor, played Lt. Benjamin Krieg in the NBC TV series seaQuest DSV
Matt D'Aquino (born 1985), Australian Judoka who has represented Judo at the 2008 Beijing Olympic Games and four World Championships
Raffaele D'Aquino (born 1903), Italian professional football player

See also
San Mango d'Aquino, town and comune in the province of Catanzaro, in the Calabria region of southern Italy